Hezheng County is a county in the Linxia Hui Autonomous Prefecture, province of Gansu of the People's Republic of China.

Ethnic groups include Han, Hui, and Dongxiang.

Administrative divisions
Hezheng County is divided to 8 towns and 4 townships.
Towns

Townships

Climate

Sources 

 
County-level divisions of Gansu